Soule is a former viscounty and French province and part of the present-day Pyrénées-Atlantiques département.

Soule may also refer to:

Surname or given name
Abdou Soulé Elbak (1954 –), president of the autonomous island of Grande Comore
Augustus Soule (1827–1887), justice of the Massachusetts Supreme Judicial Court
Charles Soule, American comic book writer
Charles Carroll Soule, American bookseller
Chris Soule (1973 –), American skeleton racer
Christophe Soulé (1951 –), French mathematician
George Soule (Mayflower passenger) (c. 1602–1677/80)
George Soulé (industrialist) (1849–1922), founder of the Soulé Steam Feed Works
George Soulé (musician) (born 1945), American songwriter, musician and record producer
George Soule (educator) (1834–1926), Louisiana author, educator, and soldier
George Henry Soule Jr. (1887–1970), labor economist and editor for the New Republic
Jared Taylor Soule (born 1989), music producer known professionally as Full Tac
Jeremy Soule (1975 –), American video game music composer
Joshua Soule (1781 – 1867), American bishop
Maris Soule (1939 –), American author
Matías Soulé (2003 –), Argentine professional footballer 
Michael E. Soulé, American biologist
Micky Lee Soule (1946 –), American keyboardist
Nathan Soule, American politician from New York
Olan Soule (1909 – 1994), actor
Pierre Soulé (1801 – 1870), American politician
Richard Soule (1966 –), Australian cricketer
Samuel W. Soulé, American inventor
Silas Soule (1838 – 1865), Captain in the American Civil War
Soulé (singer), Irish R&B and pop singer-songwriter

Other
La soule, a team sport
Soulé Steam Feed Works, a business in Meridian, Mississippi
Soule University (Texas) and Soule College (Tennessee), named for Methodist bishop Joshua Soule 
Soule College in Kansas (Presbyterian)
Soule Business College in New Orleans, Louisiana from 1856 to 1983

See also
Soul (disambiguation)
Soules, a surname